Nadia Offendal (born 22 October 1994) is a Danish handball player for french league club Chambray Touraine Handball and the Danish national team.

She participated at the 2018 European Women's Handball Championship.

Achievements
Damehåndboldligaen (Danish league):
Silver Medalist: 2018, 2020 (with Odense Håndbold)
Bronze Medalist: 2019 (with Odense Håndbold)
Danish Cup:
Finalist: 2018, 2019 (with Odense Håndbold)
Ligue Butagaz Énergie (French league):
3rd: 2022 (with Paris 92)
6th: 2021 (with Paris 92)

References 

Danish female handball players
1994 births
Living people
People from Greve Municipality
Sportspeople from Region Zealand